Graeme Reid (born 15 June 1948), also known as Graham Reid, is a retired field hockey player from Australia. He was a member of the national team that won the silver medal at the 1976 Summer Olympics in Montreal, Quebec, Canada.  He also represented Australia at the 1972 Summer Olympics in Munich, Germany.

References

External links
 
 
 
 

1948 births
Living people
Australian male field hockey players
Olympic field hockey players of Australia
Olympic silver medalists for Australia
Olympic medalists in field hockey
Field hockey players at the 1972 Summer Olympics
Field hockey players at the 1976 Summer Olympics
Medalists at the 1976 Summer Olympics
Place of birth missing (living people)